Gastrotheca piperata is a species of frog in the family Hemiphractidae.

Distribution and habitat
It is endemic to Bolivia. Gastrotheca piperata can be found in the areas of higher montane forests. Its natural habitats are subtropical or tropical moist montane forests and intermittent freshwater marshes. It has the ability to adapt to habitat degradation. It can also be found along the eastern Andean slopes of Cochabamba and Santa Cruz Departments, Bolivia.

Biology
Gastrotheca piperata is dispersed over a large area that includes two protected areas which allows the species to not be in any concern to become an endangered species. It is threatened by habitat loss.  can be found on high vegetation. When males are calling females, it is recorded that the males call from the location of canopies of small trees. Females release their tadpoles into small puddles and ditches.

References

piperata
Amphibians of Bolivia
Amphibians of the Andes
Endemic fauna of Bolivia
Amphibians described in 2005
Taxonomy articles created by Polbot